Nick Kolarac (born May 10, 1992) is a professional American soccer player who plays for Pittsburgh Hotspurs in the National Premier Soccer League. He played in two different professional leagues in the United States including the USL and MASL. Kolarac also played in the top 2 development leagues in the America the PDL and NPSL.

Career

College and semi-professional
Kolarac was born in Pittsburgh, Pennsylvania and was raised in Imperial, Pennsylvania. He played high school soccer for West Allegheny Senior High School and according to ESPN Rise he led the nation in assists with 39 his senior year 2010. Kolarac played for the Red Flash of Saint Francis University from 2010 to 2013. He appeared in 73 matches, tallying 20 goals and 14 assists over that time. While in college, Kolarac also played for the IMG Academy Bradenton of the Premier Development League in 2013, making 10 appearances. In 2014, he made 13 appearances and scored 3 goal for the Michigan Bucks of the PDL also. The Bucks would go on to win the PDL championship that season.

Professional
In 2014 following his college career, Kolarac trialed with the Colorado Rapids of Major League Soccer and was offered a contract by UMF Tindastóll of the 1. deild karla, the second division of football in Iceland. After playing for the Michigan Bucks, Kolarac signed with the Philadelphia Fury on August 10, 2014. Kolarac was the leading point scorer for the Philadelphia Fury and was the only player to start all 10 matches. It was announced on March 12, 2015 that Kolarac signed for his hometown club, the Pittsburgh Riverhounds of the USL. On January 11, 2017 Kolarac agreed to terms with the St. Louis Ambush (2013–) of the MASL. Kolarac went on to score his first professional indoor goal in his debut against the Florida Tropics It was announced on April 25, 2017 that Kolarac signed with Fort Pitt Regiment after the 16–17 Ambush season. That season Kolarac was a staple in the midfield for the club starting 10 out of 10 matches as well as being the leading point scorer on the team with 3 goals and 3 assists. Kolarac resigned with the Fort Pitt Regiment on May 1 for the 2018 season he was also named team captain for the squad. Kolarac played a crucial part in the 2018 season for Fort Pitt. He had 10 appearances for the club while also notching NPSL All Conference XI for the East Conference and led them to there first winning record since 2014. On March 26, 2019, Kolarac became the first signing in the history of the Pittsburgh Hotspurs. The club announced they were signing the veteran midfielder for the 2019 NPSL season. Kolarac led the Hotspurs to their first playoff birth in club history in 2021 with a 8-2 overall record in the Rustbelt conference. Kolarac had 3 goals and 4 assists on the season. Kolarac was selected to the 2021 all conference XI, and also won Goal of the season for the NPSL.

Honors
PDL Champion: 2014
All-NEC First Team: 2013
All-NEC Second Team: 2012
NSCAA All-North Atlantic Region: 2012, 2013
Led country in assists senior year high school 2009 with 39 assists
Captain for Fort Pitt Regiment 2016–2018
NPSL All East Conference XI Midfield selection 2017
NPSL All East Conference XI Midfield selection 2018
Named Captain of the Pittsburgh Hotspurs 2019-
NPSL All East Conference XI Midfield selection 2019 
NPSL 2020 Members Cup Champion
NPSL All Rust Belt Conference XI Forward selection 2021 (4th consecutive year)
NPSL Goal of the season award

References

External links
Saint Francis University profile

1992 births
Living people
American soccer players
Association football midfielders
IMG Academy Bradenton players
Major Arena Soccer League players
Flint City Bucks players
National Premier Soccer League players
Pittsburgh Riverhounds SC players
Soccer players from Pittsburgh
St. Louis Ambush (1992–2000) players
St. Louis Ambush (2013–) players
USL Championship players
USL League Two players
Philadelphia Fury players
Soccer players from Pennsylvania